Óscar Jiménez may refer to:
 Oscar Jimenez (comics) (born 1974), Spanish comic book artist
 Óscar Jiménez (footballer, born 1979), Salvadoran footballer
 Oscar Jimenez (soccer) (born 1989), American soccer player
 Óscar Francisco Jiménez (born 1988), Mexican footballer